Note:

"Modern" is defined as post-WWI period, from 1918 until today.
"North Africa" has a definition approximately that of the Arab term Maghreb, in addition to Egypt
"Conflict" is defined as a separate 100+ casualty incident.
In all cases conflicts are listed by total deaths, including subconflicts (specified below).

List of conflicts

Casualties breakdown 
North African Campaign (WWII) – combined figure ~430,000 killed:
Western Desert Campaign – 50,000 casualties
Battle of Cape Bon – 900+ casualties
Raid on Alexandria (1941) – 8 casualties
Action off Cape Bougaroun – 27 killed
Mers al-Kbir – 1,299 killed
Operation Torch – 1,825 killed
Tunisia campaign – ~376,000 killed

Polisario Front dispute for independence (combined casualty figure 14,020–14,038):
Western Sahara War – 7,000 Moroccan, Mauritianian and French soldiers killed; 4,000 Polisario killed; 3,000 civilians killed
Independence Intifada (Western Sahara) – 1 killed
Gdeim Izik protest camp – 18–36 killed
2011 Sahrawi protests – 1 killed

Tuareg rebellion (1990–1995) combined casualties at least 650–1,500:
Tchin-Tabaradene massacre – 650–1,500 civilians killed

Egyptian Crisis (2011–2014) combined casualty figure 4,686–4,687:
2011 Egyptian Revolution – 846 killed
Aftermath of the Egyptian Revolution – 300 killed
Timeline of the Egyptian Crisis under Mohamed Morsi – 127–128 killed
Post-coup unrest in Egypt (2013–2014) – 3,143 killed
Insurgency in Egypt (2013–present) – 570 killed

Libyan Crisis (2011–present) combined casualty figure 40,000+:
First Libyan Civil War – 25,000–30,000 killed
Factional violence in Libya (2011–2014) – over 1,000 killed
Second Libyan Civil War – thousands killed

See also
List of conflicts in Africa
List of modern conflicts in the Middle East

References

Maghreb
Conflicts
Conflicts
Military history of Africa
Wars involving the states and peoples of Africa